The Bronze Bow is a book by Elizabeth George Speare that won the Newbery Medal for excellence in American children's literature in 1962.

Plot
This book is set in first century Galilee, Israel. The main character is a young Jew named Daniel bar Jamin who lives at the same time as Jesus of Nazareth.

Daniel's father was killed in front of him, as an example, by the Roman occupiers. His uncle did not have money to pay the tax, so he was thrown in jail; when his father tried to break Daniel's uncle out of jail, they were both crucified. Even at eight, he hates and distrusts the Romans and vows that he will avenge his father's death. His mother dies of grief after her husband's death, and Daniel's younger sister, Leah, is traumatized by these events, possessed by demons but that is just a phrase, and never leaves the house. His parents' death is because of the purchase of a shawl. The children are both taken in by their grandmother, but as she becomes ill and poor over the years, she sells Daniel to Amalek the blacksmith. Daniel escapes his cruel master, running away to the mountains where he is found close to death and rescued by Rosh, the leader of an outlaw band of rebels, who plan to someday overthrow the Romans. They adopt Daniel into their crew, and Daniel begins a new life in the mountains, trying to forget about his grandmother and sister he had left behind in the village.

Several years after these events, Daniel meets people he used to know when he lived in Ketzah, Joel bar Hezron and his twin sister Malthace, who climbed the mountain for the holidays. Joel wants to join Rosh's band, so he promises Rosh that he will be a spy in Capernaum, the city to which he is moving.

Rosh sends Daniel out on a mission to capture a slave. The crew names him Samson (a character in the Biblical Book of Judges with immense strength) for his brute strength. Samson doesn't speak their language, but he sees Daniel as his master/friend and follows him. One day, Simon the Zealot (Daniel's friend from the village), comes to tell Daniel his grandmother is dying. He returns to his village of Ketzah and sees his grandmother. She passes away and Daniel is left in charge of Leah. Later, Simon tells Daniel he is going to follow Jesus and leaves Daniel in charge of his shop; Daniel and Leah move to Simon's shop and home.

Now that Daniel remains in the blacksmith shop rather than the mountains with Rosh's crew, Daniel begins recruiting young men who are around his age to rebel against the Romans. They decide on a password, which is from the song of David: 'He trains my hands for war so that my arms can bend a bow of bronze.' They meet in an abandoned watchtower outside of the village and slowly begin rebelling small bits at a time. One day, Rosh gives Joel a mission: he is to find out who is coming to a special banquet thrown for a special legation from Rome. Joel finds out the names by chatting to the servants and slaves of the house, and even after the banquet he continues to do so, passing on any information he can find to Rosh.  But soon, Joel is captured. Rosh refuses to help free him, so Daniel and his small band devise a plan to free him themselves. From the top of a cliff, they attack the group of Romans that are escorting the prisoners, but the attack goes wrong. They only succeed because Samson, out of sacrificial love for Daniel, shows up and rolls a boulder down on the attacking Romans and then joins the fight. The boys end up freeing Joel, but one of them dies and many of them are injured. After the fight, Samson is dragged away by the Romans and is never to be seen again. Daniel realizes that in rebelling, they had been doing the wrong thing. Instead of weakening Rome, they had weakened themselves. Together, Joel and Daniel realize that Jesus is, perhaps, the leader they had been waiting for.

A young Roman soldier named Marcus, who Daniel hated, (despite being a conquered German), befriends Daniel's sister. Daniel eventually finds out and goes into a fit of rage. Leah, who had seemed to be in the process of being cured, falls back into fully being possessed by her demons.

The story ends with Jesus healing Leah from her demons, and Daniel realizes that "to know and follow Jesus would be enough". He shows Jesus' love to the Roman soldier. Daniel invites the Roman into his home to see Leah.

Educational uses

Junior high school teachers may find The Bronze Bow helpful in supplementing social studies and language arts lessons. The attention to period and geographical detail can increase student understanding of both historical and current conditions in Israel. The variety of story telling conventions, including romance, battles, espionage, and friendship, might interest young adults as a lit set or young and emergent readers as a read aloud story. One additional use in the classroom, particularly in parochial or church school settings, is as an ethics, morals, and religious discussion starter — including its critical view of Judaism as practiced at that time.

Critical views
At the time of the book's publication, Kirkus Reviews said: "The author succeeds admirably in re-entering the era and filling it with entirely human characters... Alive and colorful biblical fare in the well modulated manner of Elizabeth Speare." In a retrospective essay about the Newbery Medal-winning books from 1956 to 1965, librarian Carolyn Horovitz wrote of The Bronze Bow, Carry On, Mr. Bowditch, Rifles for Watie and The Witch of Blackbird Pond: "All have value, all are told skilfully. If they lack the qualities of greatness, it is largely because their style has a commercial sameness."

The book has been criticized by some Jewish and Christian groups and scholars for a "hostile" depiction of Judaism as practised at that time, an idealized version of Christianity, and for what some believe to be historical inaccuracies. Written by a Sunday School teacher, it arguably represents missionary literature and its use in classroom instruction remains controversial. For more details see:
The Bronze Bow: A Critical Website and
The Bronze Bow in public schools: issues and insights

After critics alleged the book "glorified Jesus and vilified Jews", The Bronze Bow was removed from the social studies reading list of San Rafael City Schools in 2006. The removal prompted protests from some of the district's high school English teachers over "the specter of censorship of the curriculum."

References

1961 American novels
American children's novels
American Christian novels
Censored books
Children's historical novels
Houghton Mifflin books
Newbery Medal–winning works
Novelistic portrayals of Jesus
Novels based on the Bible
Novels set in the 1st century
1961 children's books